The 1920 Washington and Lee Generals football team represented Washington and Lee University during the 1920 college football season.

Schedule

References

Washington and Lee
Washington and Lee Generals football seasons
Washington and Lee Generals football